State Route 652 (SR 652) is a north–south unsigned state highway in the southern portion of Ohio. Its southern terminus is on the Ben Williamson Memorial Bridge and Simeon Willis Memorial Bridge on the Ohio River near Coal Grove, and it runs  to U.S. Route 52 (US 52).

Route description
The highway follows the dual Ben Williamson Memorial Bridge (southbound) and Simeon Willis Memorial Bridge (northbound) crossings the Ohio River from Ashland, Kentucky, into Lawrence County, Ohio. The first  of the SR 652 definition is the Ohio section of these bridges.

History
SR 652 made its first appearance in August 2012 after federal law changes required the Ohio Department of Transportation (ODOT) to designate a route number on state-maintained roads receiving federal aid.

Major intersections

See also

References

External links

652
Transportation in Lawrence County, Ohio
State highways in the United States shorter than one mile